"Criticize"  is a song by American recording artist Alexander O'Neal, written by O'Neal and Jellybean Johnson. It was the second single from O'Neal's second solo album, Hearsay (1987). The song's distinctive backing vocals were performed by Lisa Keith. Following the successful chart performances of the Hearsay single "Fake", "Criticize" was released as the album's second single.

Meaning
The song's lyrics are a personal commentary, critical of a nagging ex-lover, who criticizes his "friends", "ideals", "lifestyle", and "feeling[s]".

Release
"Criticize" peaked at number four on the R&B chart, and number 70 on the Billboard Hot 100. 

In the United Kingdom, "Criticize" peaked at number four on the UK Singles Chart, becoming O'Neal's biggest hit in Britain, and in 2020 was certified Silver by the British Phonographic Industry. 

In Ireland, "Criticize" peaked at number 14 on the Irish Singles Chart.

In popular culture
The song is featured in the soundtrack of the video game Grand Theft Auto IV on the in-game radio station "The Vibe 98.8".

Track listing
 12" Maxi (Tabu TBU 651158 6)
 "Criticize (Remix)" – 7:00
 "Criticize (Edit)" – 3:55
 "Criticize (A Cappella)" – 2:40
 "Criticize (Critical Mix)" – 5:30
 "Criticize (Critical Edit)" – 3:45
 "Criticize (Critical Dub)" – 4:30
 "Criticize (Nag Mix)" – 1:35

 12" Single
 "Criticize (Remix)" – 7:00
 "Criticize (Critical Mix)" – 5:30
 "Fake (Extended Version)" – 5:20

 7" Single (Tabu 651158 7)
 "Criticize" – 4:00
 "A Broken Heart Can Mend" – 3:40

Personnel
Credits are adapted from the album's liner notes.
 Alexander O'Neal - lead vocals and backing vocals
 Jellybean Johnson - synthesizers, electric guitar and drum machine
 Jimmy Jam - synthesizers
 Lisa Keith - backing vocals
 Brie Howard-Darling - drums, matraca and timbals

Sales chart performance

Peak positions

Certifications

Re-recording
Alexander O’Neal re-recorded “Criticize” in 1998 with producers Errol Jones and John Girvan.  The song was released as a commercial single, peaking at number 51 on the UK Singles Chart.

Track listing
 UK CD Single (OWECD3)
 "Criticize (‘98 Critical Yojo Working Radio Mix)" – 3:59
 "Criticize (‘98 Chill Out Positivity Krew Radio Mix)" – 4:38
 "Criticize (‘98 Critical Yojo Working Club Mix)" – 6:56
 "Criticize (‘98 House Positivity Mix)" – 4:20

 UK 12” Single (OWET3)
 "Criticize (‘98 Critical Yojo Working Club Mix)" – 6:56
 "Criticize (‘98 Critical Yojo Working Radio Mix)" – 3:59
 "Criticize (‘98 Dub Mix)" – 4:38

 Germany 12” Single (0066260CLU)
 "Criticize 1999 (Bini & Martini Club Vocal Mix)" – 7:22
 "Criticize 1999 (Bini & Martini Ocean Dub)" – 6:05
 "Criticize 1999 (Bini & Martini Subsonic Vocal Mix)" – 8:30
 "Criticize 1999 (Bini & Martini Subsonic Dub)" – 7:52

 Germany 12” Single (0066540CLU)
 "Criticize (Stonebridge Club Mix)" – 9:52
 "Criticize (Critical Yojo Working Club Mix)" – 6:56
 "Criticize (Jamie Lewis Phat Club Mix)" – 7:49

 Italy 12” Single (BLUE012)
 "Criticize '99 (Jamie Lewis Phat Club Mix)" – 7:49
 "Criticize '99 (Harley & Muscle Deep House Mix)" – 7:54

 Italy 12” Single (BLUE013)
 "Criticize 1999 (Bini & Martini Club Vocal Mix)" – 7:22
 "Criticize 1999 (Bini & Martini Ocean Dub)" – 6:05
 "Criticize 1999 (Bini & Martini Sub Sonic Vocal Dub)" – 8:30

References

1987 singles
Alexander O'Neal songs
1987 songs
Song recordings produced by Jimmy Jam and Terry Lewis
Songs written by Jellybean Johnson
Songs written by Alexander O'Neal